Avenarius (translated from ) may refer to:

 Ferdinand Avenarius (1856–1923), a German poet
 Georgy Alexandrovich Avenarius (1903–1958), one of the founders of Soviet film criticism
 Johannes Avenarius, or Johann Habermann (1516–1590), a theologian
 Richard Avenarius (1843–1896), a philosopher

Latin-language surnames
Occupational surnames
Surnames of German origin